Santa Lucía is a central department of San Juan Province in Argentina.

Departments of San Juan Province, Argentina